The 2003 Sacramento State Hornets football team represented California State University, Sacramento as a member of the Big Sky Conference during the 2003 NCAA Division I-AA football season. Led by first-year head coach Steve Mooshagian, Sacramento State compiled an overall record of 2–9 with a mark of 1–6 in conference play, tying for seventh place in the Big Sky. The team was outscored by its opponents 332 to 237 for the season. The Hornets played home games at Hornet Stadium in Sacramento, California.

Schedule

Team players in the NFL
The following Sacramento State players were selected in the 2004 NFL Draft.

References

Sacramento State
Sacramento State Hornets football seasons
Sacramento State Hornets football